Fatemeh Naghavi is an Iranian actress.

Career 
She is known for her film The Circle (2000) in the western world. Her films include Dayereh (2000), Nasl-e sookhte (1999), Mosaferan (1992), Do film ba yek belit (1990), Gonge Khab Dideh (The Mute Dream) (2002) (directed by her husband, noted Iranian director Attila Pessyani), and Devil's Ship (2008).

Personal life 
Naghavi is married to actor Atila Pesyani, with whom she has two children: Setareh and Khosro.

References

External links
 

Year of birth missing (living people)
Living people
Iranian film actresses
20th-century Iranian actresses
21st-century Iranian actresses